Hans Nielsen may refer to:

 Hans Nielsen (actor) (1911–1965), German actor
 Hans Nielsen (American football) (born 1952), Danish football player
 Hans Nielsen (composer) (1580–1626), Danish madrigal composer at the court of Christian IV
 Hans Nielsen (speedway rider) (born 1959), Danish speedway racer
 Hans Bruun Nielsen, Danish mathematician
 Hans Christian Nielsen (1928–1990), Danish footballer
 Hans Christian Nielsen (cyclist) (1916–2004), Danish cyclist
 Hans Frede Nielsen (1943–2021), Danish philologist
 Hans Jacob Nielsen (1899–1967), Danish boxer
 Hans Peter Nielsen (gymnast) (born 1943), Danish gymnast
 Hans Peter Nielsen (politician) (1852–1928), Danish farmer and politician

See also
Hans Nilsen
Hans Nilsson (disambiguation)